Alma School/Main Street is a station on the Metro light rail line in Mesa, Arizona, United States. The station is located one block east of the intersection of West Main Street and Alma School Road and opened on August 22, 2015.

References

External links
 Valley Metro map

Valley Metro Rail stations
Transportation in Mesa, Arizona
Railway stations in the United States opened in 2015
Buildings and structures in Mesa, Arizona
2015 establishments in Arizona